Straight Is the Way is a 1934 American drama film directed by Paul Sloane, written by Bernard Schubert, and starring Franchot Tone, May Robson, Karen Morley, Gladys George, Nat Pendleton and Jack La Rue. It is based upon the stage play by Dana Burnet and George Abbott. It was released on August 10, 1934, by Metro-Goldwyn-Mayer.

Plot

Cast 
Franchot Tone as Benny
May Robson as Mrs. Horowitz
Karen Morley as Bertha
Gladys George as Shirley
Nat Pendleton as Skippy
Jack La Rue as Monk
C. Henry Gordon as Sullivan
Raymond Hatton as Mendel
William Bakewell as Dr. Wilkes
John Qualen as Mr. Chapman

References

External links 
 

1934 films
American drama films
1934 drama films
Metro-Goldwyn-Mayer films
American black-and-white films
Films directed by Paul Sloane
1930s English-language films
1930s American films